The 1939 Ball State Cardinals football team was an American football team that represented Ball State Teachers College (later renamed Ball State University) in the Indiana Intercollegiate Conference (IIC) during the 1939 college football season. In their fifth season under head coach John Magnabosco, the Cardinals compiled a 6–2 record (5–1 against IIC opponents), finished in second place out of 14 teams in the IIC, and outscored all opponents by a total of 112 to 69. The team played its home games at Ball State Field in Muncie, Indiana.

Schedule

References

Ball State
Ball State Cardinals football seasons
Ball State Cardinals football